Kaarta, or Ka'arta, was a short-lived Bambara kingdom in what is today the western half of Mali.  

As Bitòn Coulibaly tightened his control over Ségou, capital of his newly founded Bambara Empire, a faction of Ségou Bambara dissatisfied with his rule fled west.  In 1753, they founded the kingdom of Kaarta on the homeland of the long-defunct Ghana Empire, taking Nioro du Sahel as their capital.  The kingdom was destroyed as an independent force in 1854 by El Hadj Umar Tall's jihad across West Africa; Umar Tall seized Nioro, and put the Kaarta king (Fama) Mamady Kandian and his entire family to death.  

In 1878 the French governor of Senegal Briere de l'Isle sent a French force against the Kaarta Toucouleur vassal state along the north bank of the Senegal River. Blocked by the colonial minister in Paris, he argued that they were a threat to the Senegalese Imamate of Futa Toro (then a French client state) with which the British were poised to interfere.  The Ministry gave in and on 7 July 1878, a French force destroyed the Kaarta Toucouleur fort at Sabouciré, killing their leader, Almany Niamody. This portion of the Kaarta vassals was then incorporated into the Khasso  protectorate kingdom.

French Colonel Louis Archinard later conquered the entire territory of the former Kaarta kingdom in 1890, which was formally annexed into French West Africa in 1904.

References

Countries in precolonial Africa
French West Africa
History of Mali
Bamana
States and territories established in 1753
States and territories disestablished in 1904
1753 establishments in Africa
1904 disestablishments in Africa

Sahelian kingdoms